Depressaria absynthiella is a moth of the family Depressariidae. It is found in France, Germany, Switzerland, Austria, Italy, the Czech Republic, Hungary, Romania, Ukraine, Bulgaria, North Macedonia, Albania and Greece.

The larvae feed on Artemisia absinthium.

References

External links
lepiforum.de

Moths described in 1865
Depressaria
Moths of Europe